Wehella Kankanamge Indika is a Sri Lankan politician and a member of the Parliament of Sri Lanka.

Political career

 Provincial Council Member, 1990–2003 
 Provincial Minister of Agriculture and Irrigation, 2003–2004 
 Provincial Minister of Sports, Rural Development and Youth Affairs, 2004–2009 
 Provincial Minister for Education and Co-operatives, 2009–present.

References

Members of the 14th Parliament of Sri Lanka
1966 births
Living people